Galilaya is a town in the Kayunga District of the Central Region of Uganda. The town is also known by its correct phonetic spelling, as Galiraya.

Location
Galilaya is in extreme northern Kayunga District, at the northern end of the Kayunga-Galilaya Road. The coordinates of Galiraya are: 1°22'12.0"N, 32°48'54.0"E (Latitude: 1.3700; Longitude: 32.8150).

Overview
Galilaya is the location of the headquarters of Galilaya sub-county, one of the four sub-counties in Bbaale County, a constituent of Kayunga District. The town is one  of the northernmost urban centers in the Central Region. Galilaya is close to the point where the Victoria Nile enters Lake Kyoga, to the east of town. Not far from the town center, to the west of town, the River Sezibwa also enters Lake Kyoga after its  northward journey.

Points of interest
The following points of interest lie within the town or close to its borders:

 Offices of Galilaya Town Council
 Galilaya central market
 Galilaya police station
 Galilaya Health Centre, administered by the Uganda Ministry of Health
 The northern end of the Kayunga–Galiraya Road is located in town.

See also
 Ntenjeru
 Bbaale

References

External links
 Location of Galilaya At Google Maps

Populated places in Uganda
Cities in the Great Rift Valley
Kayunga District
Lake Kyoga